"Tomorrow's Way" is the second single by the Japanese artist Yui. It was released June 22, 2005, under Sony Records. The song was also featured as the ending theme in the Japanese movie Hinokio. The boy who appears in the song's music video is Kanata Hongō, who also stars in the movie. The music video was directed by Takahiro Miki.

Hong Kong singer and actress Fiona Sit covered this song as "Dear Fiona", a Cantonese version.

Track listing

Oricon Sales Chart (Japan)

References

Yui (singer) songs
2005 singles
Songs written by Yui (singer)
Japanese film songs
2005 songs